Franz Kenneth Stahl (born October 30, 1961) is an American guitarist, best known for being a member of both the Washington, D.C. hardcore punk band Scream with his brother Pete Stahl, and the alternative rock band Foo Fighters.

Life and career

Franz and his brother Pete were raised in Bailey's Crossroads, Virginia, which they reference by putting the letters "BXR" in Scream's albums. Their father, Arnold, was a lawyer and also managed the DC rock band The Hangmen, who scored a regional hit with 1965's "What a Girl Can't Do". After learning guitar, Franz started playing in local Virginian bands with bassist Skeeter Thompson. In 1981, Franz and Thompson formed Scream in Alexandria, along with Pete and drummer Kent Stax.

After Scream broke up in 1990, Franz and Pete formed the band Wool, which released the album Box Set for London Records before breaking up in 1996. As Stahl visited a friend who was producing Japanese musician J, he found out that the drummer was fellow DC musician Scott Garrett, and that they needed a guitarist for the tour. Stahl accepted, and played around Japan as a member of J's backing band. During the tour, Franz Stahl was invited by Grohl to replace the Foo Fighters' original guitarist Pat Smear, who had decided to leave the band. After the tour was finished, he flew in just two days before his debut performance at the Radio City Music Hall in September 1997, having just one day of rehearsal. Stahl started his Foo Fighters career with their hit "Everlong" from their second studio album, The Colour and the Shape.

Stahl performed on the track "A320", which was featured in Godzilla: The Album, and the re-recorded version of the Foo Fighters song "Walking After You", which was released as a single and is included on the soundtrack for The X-Files movie. Stahl also appeared in the music video for the Foo Fighters song "My Hero", even though he did not play on the recording. He was released from the band in 1999, before the recording of their third studio album, There Is Nothing Left to Lose, due to creative differences. Stahl still said his tenure in Foo Fighters was "the best two years of my life". After leaving, J invited Stahl back, and he remained as his guitarist for another seven years until 2005. In 2009, Franz was invited by Pete to play for Smith & Pyle, and during the tour the brothers decided to reform Scream with Thompson and Stax.

Stahl is a big fan of the Gibson Les Paul, which he is usually seen using. However, in the music video for Foo Fighters's "My Hero", Franz is seen using a Fender Stratocaster.

Stahl currently lives in Hollywood, California. Along with Scream, he continued gigging, writing and recording with the Boston Hardcore band DYS, while also writing, and composing for film and television. In 2007, he composed the title track for the film One California Day.

References

External links
Mind The Tracks - Franz Kenneth Stahl website
Franz Stahl | Evolution Music Partners catalog
Franz Stahl LinkedIn profile

Living people
American rock guitarists
American male guitarists
Scream (band) members
Foo Fighters members
1962 births
Place of birth missing (living people)
20th-century American guitarists
People from Fairfax County, Virginia
Wool (band) members